A paraprosdokian is a figure of speech in which the latter part of a sentence, phrase, or larger discourse is surprising or unexpected in a way that causes the reader or listener to reframe or reinterpret the first part. It is frequently used for humorous or dramatic effect, sometimes producing an anticlimax. For this reason, it is extremely popular among comedians and satirists such as Groucho Marx.

Etymology
"Paraprosdokian" comes from the Greek "παρά", meaning "against", and "προσδοκία", meaning "expectation". The noun "prosdokia" occurs with the preposition "para" in Greek rhetorical writers of the 1st century BCE and the 1st and 2nd centuries CE, with the meaning "contrary to expectation" or "unexpectedly." These four sources are cited under "prosdokia" in Liddell-Scott-Jones, Greek Lexicon. Canadian linguist and etymology author William Gordon Casselman argues that, while the word is now in wide circulation, "paraprosdokian" (or "paraprosdokia") is not a term of classical (or medieval) Greek or Latin rhetoric, but a late 20th-century neologism, citing the fact that the word does not yet appear in the Oxford English Dictionary as evidence of its late coinage. However, the word appeared in print as early as 1891 in a humorous article in Punch: 'A "paraprosdokian," which delights him to the point of repetition.'

Double meaning
Some paraprosdokians do not only change the meaning of an early phrase (see garden-path sentence), but they also play on the double meaning of a particular word, creating a form of syllepsis or antanaclasis (a type of pun). For example, in response to the question "how are you two?", a Modern Hebrew speaker can say  (be-séder gamúr; i be-séder, aní gamúr), literally "in-order complete; she in-order, I complete", i.e., "We are very good. She is good, I am finished". Note the ambiguity of the Hebrew lexical item גמור gamúr: it means both "complete" and "finished". A parallel punning paraprosdokian in English is a man's response to a friend's question "Why are you and your wife here?: A workshop; I am working, she is shopping."

Examples

 "Take my wife—please!" —Henny Youngman
 "There but for the grace of God—goes God." —Winston Churchill
 "If I could just say a few words … I'd be a better public speaker." —Homer Simpson
 "If I am reading this graph correctly—I'd be very surprised." —Stephen Colbert
 "If all the girls attending the Yale prom were laid end to end, I wouldn't be a bit surprised." —Dorothy Parker
 "On his feet he wore … blisters." —Aristotle
 "I've had a perfectly wonderful evening, but this wasn't it." —Groucho Marx
 "My uncle's dying wish was to have me sit in his lap; he was in the electric chair." —Rodney Dangerfield
 "I like going to the park and watching the children run around because they don't know I'm using blanks." —Emo Philips
 "I haven't slept for ten days, because that would be too long." —Mitch Hedberg
 "I sleep eight hours a day and at least ten at night." —Bill Hicks
 "I don't belong to an organized political party. I'm a Democrat." —Will Rogers
 “War does not determine who is right—only who is left.” — Bertrand Russell
 "On the other hand, you have different fingers." —Steven Wright
 "He was at his best when the going was good." —Alistair Cooke
 "Outside of a dog, a book is man’s best friend. Inside of a dog, it’s too dark to read." —Jim Brewer, sometimes attributed to Groucho Marx

See also
Garden-path sentence
List of linguistic example sentences
One-line joke
Pun

References

External links

Figures of speech
Greek words and phrases
Jokes
Rhetoric
Word play